Daily Maverick is an independent South African online news publication and weekly print newspaper.

It is known for breaking some of South Africa’s defining stories of the past decade, including the Marikana Massacre, in which the South African Police Service killed 34 miners in August 2012. It also investigated the Gupta Leaks, which won the 2019 Global Shining Light Award alongside Rappler, the Filipino publication founded by Nobel Prize laureate Maria Ressa.  

That investigation was credited with exposing the Indian-born Gupta family and former President Jacob Zuma for their role in the systemic political corruption referred to as state capture. In 2018, co-founder and editor-in-chief Branislav ‘Branko’ Brkic   was awarded the country’s prestigious Nat Nakasa Award, recognised for initiating the investigative collaboration after receiving the hard drive that included the email tranche. In 2021, co-founder and CEO Styli Charalambous  also received the award.

Background 
Daily Maverick was launched in 2009 by Brkic and Charalambous following the closure of Brkic’s former print magazines, Maverick and Empire.  They started a “daily ipad newspaper” in 2011 to complement the existing website; it closed in 2013. The weekly print newspaper, DM168, was launched in 2020.

Daily Maverick’s membership model has been widely cited by international media development and journalism innovation groups as a successful example of the emerging membership trend that invites audiences of news publications to pay to become part of a readership community.   

In addition to its membership programme, the privately-owned publication also hosts paid live events. It also has received philanthropic funding from the Open Society Foundation, Donald Gordon Foundation, Elaine & David Potter Foundation and ABSA. It is a participant of the Media Investment Development Fund’s South African Media Innovation Programme.

The group has more than 11 publishing partners, including the amaBhungane Centre for Investigative Journalism, Ground Up, Bhekisisa Centre for Health Journalism, Declassified UK, The Conversation, the Institute of Security Studies’ and Outlaw Ocean Project. It also produces podcasts and documentary films, including Influence, directed by Poplak and Diana Neille, which premiered at the Sundance Film Festival in 2020. Section 16, which details the online attacks on Daily Maverick’s women journalists, debuted at the Encounters Film Festival.

Attacks 
Daily Maverick has come under frequent attack regarding its funding and finances, which has been largely led by the Independent Media Group;  Daily Maverick lists its funders on its website. In August 2022, a judge ruled in favour of the publication when it sued a former columnist for posting on social media that he was paid to write articles critical of Independent News.

Women journalists at Daily Maverick have been repeatedly targeted by politicians as well as private companies such as the now-defunct reputation management firm Bell Pottinger, which was implicated in a wide-ranging scandal involving the Gupta family and Zuma South Africa. The attacks were rebuked by the Committee to Protect Journalists in 2019, and documented in the UNESCO report “The Chilling: global trends in online violence against women journalists,” which was based on a global survey of 901 journalists from 125 countries.

Awards
2010 Bookmarks – Individual and Team Publisher Awards – Best Editorial Team – Daily Maverick
2011 Bookmarks – Product Awards – Email Marketing – Email Publication – Silver – First Thing Newsletter – Daily Maverick
2011 Bookmarks – Craft Awards – Editorial (Media – News, Magazines, Radio and TV Stations/Networks) – Silver – Daily Maverick
2011 Bookmarks – Individual and Team Awards – Best Digital Editorial Individual – Stephen Grootes – Daily Maverick
2012 Bookmarks – Core Awards – Websites/Microsites/Mobisites – Publisher Sites (Mass Appeal) > R5m Turnover – Bronze – Daily Maverick and iMaverick
2012 Bookmarks – Core Awards – Email Marketing – Email Publication – Silver – First Thing Newsletter – Daily Maverick
2012 Bookmarks – Core Awards – Applications and Tools – Tablet Publication – Bronze – iMaverick
2012 Bookmarks – Core Awards – Integrated / Mixed Media – Multi-platform Publisher – Bronze – First Thing Newsletter, Daily Maverick and iMaverick – Daily Maverick
2012 Bookmarks – Craft Awards – Editorial (Media – News, Magazines, Radio and TV Stations/Networks) – Silver – First Thing Newsletter, Daily Maverick and iMaverick – Daily Maverick
2012 Bookmarks – Individual and Team Awards – The Digital Maverick – Branko Brkic
2012 Bookmarks – Individual and Team Awards – Best Digital Editorial Individual – Branko Brkic – Daily Maverick and iMaverick
2012 Bookmarks – Individual and Team Awards – Best Youngster – Sipho Hlongwane – Daily Maverick
2012 Bookmarks – Special Honours Awards – Best Publishing House – Daily Maverick and iMaverick
2012 SAB Sports Media Awards – New Media – Social Media Correspondent of the Year – Styli Charalambous – Daily Maverick
2012 Taco Kuiper Award for Investigative Journalism – Runner-up – Greg Marinovich – Daily Maverick
2013 Vodacom National Journalist of the Year Online winner – Greg Marinovich – Daily Maverick
2013 Bookmarks – Craft Awards – Editorial (Media – News, Magazines, Radio and TV Stations/Networks) – Silver – Daily Maverick
2013 Bookmarks – Individual and Team Awards – Best Digital Editorial Individual – Rebecca Davis – Daily Maverick
2016 CNN Multichoice African Business Journalism Award – Economics & Business Award – Diana Neille, Richard Poplak, Shaun Swingler & Sumeya Gasa, Daily Maverick, South Africa ‘Casualties of Cola: Outsourcing, Exploitation & the New Realities of Work’
2016 Vodacom Journalism Award – Online Winner – Diana Neille, Sumeya Gasa, Shaun Swingler, Richard Poplak. Daily Maverick, Casualties of Cola
2016 Taco Kuiper Investigative Journalism Awards – First Runner-up
2016 SAB Sports Media Awards – Digital Media – Converged Media – Antoinette Muller
2016 SAB Sports Media Awards – Digital Media – Written Media – Antoinette Muller
2016 SAB Sports Media Awards – Digital Media – Online Video – Leila Dougan
2017 Taco Kuiper Award for Investigative Journalism – #GuptaLeaks – 19 journalists from AmaBhungane, the Daily Maverick and News24
2018 Nat Nakasa Award for Media Integrity – South African National Editors’ Forum – Branko Brkic
2018 – Standard Bank Sikuvile Journalism Award – #GuptaLeaks – Scorpio, amaBhungane and News24
2019 – SAFTA – Golden Horn award for Best Documentary Short – Nanlaban: The Philippines War on Drugs – Chronicle
2019 – Vodacom Journalist of the Year – Multi-platform – Sune Payne and Leila Dougan – Daily Maverick
2019 – Vodacom Journalist of the Year – Financial/Economics – Marianne Merten
2019 – Global Shining Light Award – #GuptaLeaks – Daily Maverick
2020 – Standard Bank Sikuvile Journalism Award – Investigative Journalism: Journalist of the Year – Pauli van Wyk – Daily Maverick
2020 – Standard Bank Sikuvile Journalism Award – Investigative Journalism: Columns and Editorial – Richard Poplak – Daily Maverick
2021 – Nat Nakasa Award for Media Integrity – Styli Charalambous
2021 – Thomas Pringle Award – Best Portfolio – Tevya Shapiro – Daily Maverick
2021 – International Sports Press Association (AIPS) – Certificate of Achievement Award – Craig Ray – Daily Maverick
2021 – Vodacom Journalist of the Year (VJOY) Awards – Digital Vibes – Pieter Louis-Myburgh – Daily Maverick
2021 – Taco Kuiper Award – Digital Vibes – Pieter Louis-Myburgh – Daily Maverick
2021 – SA Book of the Year Awards – Best Non-fiction – Six Years With Al Qaeda – Stephen McGown – Daily Maverick
2021 – Digital Media Africa Awards – Best Paid Content Strategy – Maverick Insider – Daily Maverick

See also
 List of newspapers in South Africa

References

Further reading

External links

2009 establishments in South Africa
Daily newspapers published in South Africa
Online newspapers published in South Africa
South African news websites
Publications established in 2009
Mass media in Cape Town